Kaelon Paul Fox (born May 31, 1995) is an American soccer player who currently plays for Lexington SC in USL League One.

Playing career

College & amateur
Fox played three seasons of college soccer at the University of Kentucky between 2013 and 2016, including a redshirted season in 2015. With the Wildcats, Fox made 48 appearances and scored 5 goals. In 2013, Fox was named to the SEC First-Year Honor Roll. In 2017, Fox transferred to Saint Francis University, where he made 18 appearances and scored a single goal.

During and after college, Fox spent time in the USL PDL with Carolina Dynamo, Portland Timbers U23s, Reading United AC, and Mississippi Brilla.

Völsungur ÍF
On February, 2019, it was announced that Fox had signed his first professional contract with 2nd-tier Icelandic side Völsungur ÍF. Fox won the player of the season award in his only season with the club.

Thór
Fox moved to fellow top division Icelandic side Thór in 2020, but only made a single appearance during a season affected by the COVID-19 pandemic. He spent time on loan with his previous club Völsungur.

FC Tucson
On February 26, 2021, Fox returned to the United States, joining USL League One side FC Tucson. He made his debut for the club on May 1, 2021, starting in a 3–1 loss to South Georgia Tormenta.

Lexington SC
On January 9, 2023, Fox was announced as the first-ever signing for USL League One club Lexington SC.

References 

1995 births
American soccer players
Association football defenders
North Carolina Fusion U23 players
Expatriate footballers in Iceland
FC Tucson players
Kentucky Wildcats men's soccer players
Living people
Mississippi Brilla players
Portland Timbers U23s players
Reading United A.C. players
Saint Francis Red Flash men's soccer players
Soccer players from Kentucky
Þór Akureyri players
USL League One players
USL League Two players
Lexington SC players